Sustainability is a societal goal that relates to the ability of people to safely co-exist on Earth over a long time. Specific definitions of this term are difficult to agree on and have varied with literature, context, and time. Sustainability is commonly described as having three dimensions (or pillars): environmental, economic, and social. Many publications state that the environmental dimension is the most important. For this reason, in everyday use, sustainability is often focused on countering major environmental problems, such as climate change, loss of biodiversity, loss of ecosystem services, land degradation, and air and water pollution. The concept of sustainability can be used to guide decisions at the global, national, and individual levels (e.g. sustainable living).

A closely related concept is that of sustainable development, and the terms are often used synonymously. However, UNESCO distinguishes the two like this: "Sustainability is often thought of as a long-term goal (i.e. a more sustainable world), while sustainable development refers to the many processes and pathways to achieve it."

The concept of sustainability has been criticized for various reasons. One such criticism is that the concept is vague and merely a buzzword. Another is that sustainability as a goal might be impossible to reach; it has been pointed out that "no country is delivering what its citizens need without transgressing the biophysical planetary boundaries".  

How the economic dimension of sustainability should be addressed is controversial. Scholars have discussed this aspect under the concept of "weak and strong sustainability". For example, there will always be tension between the ideas of "welfare and prosperity for all" and environmental conservation. Therefore, trade-offs are required. Approaches that decouple economic growth from environmental deterioration would be desirable but are difficult to implement.

There are many barriers to achieving sustainability that must be addressed for a sustainability transition to become possible. Some barriers arise from nature and its complexity. Other barriers are extrinsic to the concept of sustainability. For example they can be caused by the dominant institutional frameworks in countries. Some approaches people can take to transition to environmental sustainability include: maintaining ecosystem services, reducing food waste, promoting dietary shifts towards plant-based foods, reducing fertility rates and, thus, population growth, promoting new green technologies, and adopting renewable energy sources while phasing out subsidies to fossil fuels. Global issues are difficult to tackle as they require global solutions. Existing global organizations (such as the UN and WTO) are inefficient in enforcing current global regulations. One reason for this is the lack of suitable sanctioning mechanisms.

Definitions

Current usage 
Sustainability is regarded as a "normative concept". This means it is based on what people value or find desirable: "The quest for sustainability involves connecting what is known through scientific study to applications in pursuit of what people want for the future."

The 1983 UN Commission on Environment and Development (Brundtland Commission) had a big influence on how we use the term sustainability today.  The commission's 1987 Brundtland Report provided a definition of sustainable development. The report, Our Common Future, defines it as development that "meets the needs of the present without compromising the ability of future generations to meet their own needs". The report helped bring sustainability into the mainstream of policy discussions. It also popularized the concept of sustainable development.

Some other key concepts to illustrate the meaning of sustainability include: 
 It may be a fuzzy concept but in a positive sense: the goals are more important than the approaches or means applied;
 It connects with other essential concepts such as resilience, adaptive capacity, and vulnerability.
 Choices matter: "it is not possible to sustain everything, everywhere, forever";
 Scale matters in both space and time, and place matters;
 Limits exist (see planetary boundaries).

In everyday usage, sustainability often focuses on the environmental aspects.

Specific definitions 
Scholars say that a single specific definition of sustainability may never be possible. But the concept is still useful. There have been attempts to define it, for example:
 "Sustainability can be defined as the capacity to maintain or improve the state and availability of desirable materials or conditions over the long term."
 "Sustainability [is] the long-term viability of a community, set of social institutions, or societal practice. In general, sustainability is understood as a form of intergenerational ethics in which the environmental and economic actions taken by present persons do not diminish the opportunities of future persons to enjoy similar levels of wealth, utility, or welfare."
 "Sustainability means meeting our own needs without compromising the ability of future generations to meet their own needs. In addition to natural resources, we also need social and economic resources. Sustainability is not just environmentalism. Embedded in most definitions of sustainability we also find concerns for social equity and economic development."

Some definitions focus on the environmental dimension. The Oxford Dictionary of English defines sustainability as: "the property of being environmentally sustainable; the degree to which a process or enterprise is able to be maintained or continued while avoiding the long-term depletion of natural resources".

Historical usage 

The term sustainability is derived from the Latin word sustinere. "To sustain" can mean to maintain, support, uphold, or endure. So sustainability is the ability to continue over a long period of time.

In the past, sustainability referred to environmental sustainability.  It meant using natural resources so that people in the future  could continue to rely on them in the long term. The concept of sustainability, or Nachhaltigkeit in German, goes back to Hans Carl von Carlowitz (1645–1714), and applied to forestry. We would now call this sustainable forest management. He used this term to mean the long-term responsible use of a natural resource. In his 1713 work Silvicultura oeconomica, he wrote that "the highest art/science/industriousness [...] will consist in such a conservation and replanting of timber that there can be a continuous, ongoing and sustainable use".

The idea itself goes back a very long time: Communities have always worried about the capacity of their environment to sustain them in the long term. Many ancient cultures, traditional societies, and indigenous peoples have restricted the use of natural resources.

Comparison to sustainable development 

The terms sustainability and sustainable development are closely related. In fact, they are often used to mean the same thing. Both terms are linked with the "three dimensions of sustainability" concept. One distinction is that sustainability is a general concept, while sustainable development can be a policy or organizing principle. Scholars say sustainability is a broader concept because sustainable development focuses mainly on human well-being.

Sustainable development has two linked goals. It aims to meet human development goals. It also aims to enable natural systems to provide the natural resources and ecosystem services needed for economies and society. The concept of sustainable development has come to focus on economic development, social development and environmental protection for future generations.

Dimensions

Development of three dimensions 

Scholars usually distinguish three different areas of sustainability. These are the environmental, the social, and the economic. Several terms are in use for this concept. Authors may speak of three pillars, dimensions, components, aspects, perspectives, factors, or goals. All mean the same thing in this context. The three dimensions paradigm has few theoretical foundations. It  emerged without a single point of origin. Scholars rarely question the distinction itself. The idea of sustainability with three dimensions is a dominant interpretation in the literature.

In the Brundtland Report the environment and development are inseparable go together in the search for sustainability. It described sustainable development as a global concept linking environmental and social issues. It added sustainable development is important for both developing countries and industrialized countries:

The Rio Declaration from 1992 is seen as "the foundational instrument in the move towards sustainability". It includes specific references to ecosystem integrity. The plan associated with carrying out the Rio Declaration also discusses sustainability in this way. The plan, Agenda 21, talks about economic, social, and environmental dimensions:

Agenda 2030 from 2015 also viewed sustainability in this way. It sees the 17 Sustainable Development Goals (SDGs) with their 169 targets as balancing "the three dimensions of sustainable development, the economic, social and environmental".

Hierarchy 

Scholars have discussed how to rank the three dimensions of sustainability. Many publications state that the environmental dimension is the most important. (Planetary integrity or ecological integrity are other terms for the environmental dimension.) 

Protecting ecological integrity is the core of sustainability according to many experts. If this is the case then its environmental dimension sets limits to economic and social development. 

The diagram with three nested ellipses is one way of showing the three dimensions of sustainability together with a hierarchy: It gives the environmental dimension a special status. In this diagram, the environment includes society, and society includes economic conditions. Thus it stresses a hierarchy. 

Another model shows the three dimensions in a similar way: In this SDG wedding cake model, the economy is a smaller subset of the societal system. And the societal system in turn is a smaller subset of the biosphere system.

In 2022 an assessment examined the political impacts of the Sustainable Development Goals. The assessment found that the "integrity of the earth's life-support systems" was essential for sustainability. The authors said that "the SDGs fail to recognize that planetary, people and prosperity concerns are all part of one earth system, and that the protection of planetary integrity should not be a means to an end, but an end in itself". The aspect of environmental protection is not an explicit priority for the SDGs. This causes problems as it could encourage countries to give the environment less weight in their developmental plans. The authors state that "sustainability on a planetary scale is only achievable under an overarching Planetary Integrity Goal that recognizes the biophysical limits of the planet".

Other frameworks bypass the compartmentalization of sustainability into separate dimensions completely.

Environmental sustainability 

The environmental dimension is central to the overall concept of sustainability. People became more and more aware of environmental pollution in the 1960s and 1970s. This led to discussions of sustainability and sustainable development. This process began in the 1970s with concern for environmental issues. These included natural ecosystems or natural resources and human environment. It later extended to all systems that support life on Earth, including human society. Reducing these negative impacts on the environment would improve environmental sustainability.

Environmental pollution is not a new phenomenon. But it has been only a local or regional concern for most of human history. Awareness of global environmental issues increased in the 20th century. The harmful effects and global spread of pesticides like DDT came under scrutiny in the 1960s. In the 1970s it emerged that chlorofluorocarbons (CFCs) were depleting the ozone layer. This led to the de facto ban of CFCs with the Montreal Protocol in 1987.

In the early 20th century Arrhenius discussed the effect of greenhouse gases on the climate. (See also history of climate change science). Climate change due to human activity became an academic and political topic several decades later. This led to the establishment of the IPCC in 1988 and the UNFCCC in 1992.

In 1972, the UN Conference on the Human Environment took place. It was the first UN conference on environmental issues. It stated it was important to protect and improve the human environment.It emphasized the need to protect wildlife and natural habitats:

In 2000, the UN launched eight Millennium Development Goals. The aim was for the global community to achieve them by 2015. Goal 7 was to "ensure environmental sustainability". But this goal did not mention the concepts of social or economic sustainability.

Specific problems often dominate public discussion of the environmental dimension of sustainability: In the 21st century these problems have included climate change, biodiversity and pollution. Other global problems are loss of ecosystem services, land degradation, environmental impacts of animal agriculture and air and water pollution, including marine plastic pollution and ocean acidification. Many people worry about human impacts on the environment. These include impacts on the atmosphere, land, and water resources.

Human activities now have an impact on Earth's geology and ecosystems. This led Paul Crutzen to call the current geological epoch the Anthropocene. For example, the impact of human activity on ecosystems can reach tipping points in the climate system.

Economic sustainability 

The economic dimension of sustainability is controversial. This is because the term development within sustainable development can be interpreted in different ways. Some may take it to mean only economic development and growth. This can promote an economic system that is bad for the environment  Others focus more on the trade-offs between environmental conservation and achieving welfare goals for basic needs (food, water, health, and shelter).  

Economic development can indeed reduce hunger or energy poverty. This is especially the case in the least developed countries. That is why Sustainable Development Goal 8 calls for economic growth to drive social progress and well-being. Its first target is for: "at least 7 per cent GDP growth per annum in the least developed countries". However, the challenge is to expand economic activities while reducing their environmental impact. In other words, humanity will have to find ways how societal progress (potentially by economic development) can be reached without excess strain on the environment. 

The Brundtland report says poverty causes environmental problems. Poverty also results from them. So addressing environmental problems requires understanding the factors behind world poverty and inequality. The report demands a new development path for sustained human progress. It highlights that this is a goal for both developing and industrialized nations.

UNEP and UNDP launched the Poverty-Environment Initiative in 2005 which has three goals. These are reducing extreme poverty, greenhouse gas emissions, and net natural asset loss. This guide to structural reform will enable countries to achieve the SDGs. It should also show how to address the trade-offs between ecological footprint and economic development.

Social sustainability 

The social dimension of sustainability is not well defined. One definition states that a society is sustainable in social terms if people do not face structural obstacles in key areas. These key areas are health, influence, competence, impartiality and meaning-making.  

Some scholars place social issues at the very center of discussions. They suggest that all the domains of sustainability are social. These include ecological, economic, political, and cultural sustainability. These domains all depend on the relationship between the social and the natural. The ecological domain is defined as human embeddedness in the environment.  From this perspective, social sustainability encompasses all human activities. It goes beyond the intersection of economics, the environment, and the social.

There are many broad strategies for more sustainable social systems. They include improved education and the political empowerment of women. This is especially the case in developing countries. They include greater regard for social justice. This involves equity between rich and poor both within and between countries. And it includes intergenerational equity. Providing more social safety nets to vulnerable populations would contribute to social sustainability.

A society with a high degree of social sustainability would lead to livable communities with a good quality of life (being fair, diverse, connected and democratic).

Proposed additional dimensions 
Some experts have proposed further dimensions. These could cover institutional, cultural, political, and technical dimensions.

Cultural sustainability 

Some scholars have argued for a fourth dimension. They say the traditional three dimensions do not reflect the complexity of contemporary society. For example, Agenda 21 for culture and the United Cities and Local Governments argue that sustainable development should include a solid cultural policy. They also advocate for a cultural dimension in all public policies. Another example was the Circles of Sustainability approach, which included cultural sustainability.

Interactions between dimensions

Environmental and economic dimensions 

People often debate the relationship between the environmental and economic dimensions of sustainability. In academia, this is discussed under the term weak and strong sustainability. In that model, the weak sustainability concept states that capital made by humans could replace most of the natural capital. Natural capital is a way of describing environmental resources. People may refer to it as nature. An example for this is the use of environmental technologies to reduce pollution.    

The opposite concept in that model is strong sustainability. This assumes that nature provides functions that technology cannot replace. Thus, strong sustainability acknowledges the need to preserve ecological integrity. Once we lose those functions we cannot recover or repair many resources and ecosystem services. Biodiversity, along with pollination and fertile soils, are examples. Others are clean air, clean water, and regulation of climate systems.   

Weak sustainability has come under criticism. It maybe be popular with governments and business but does not ensure the preservation of the earth's ecological integrity. This is why the environmental dimension is so important. 

The World Economic Forum illustrated this in 2020. It found that $44 trillion of economic value generation depends on nature. This value, more than half of the world's GDP, is thus vulnerable to nature loss. Three large economic sectors are highly dependent on nature: construction, agriculture, and food and beverages. Nature loss results from many factors. They include land use change, sea use change and climate change. Other examples are natural resource use, pollution, and invasive alien species.

Trade-offs 
Trade-offs between different dimensions of sustainability are a common topic for debate. Balancing the environmental, social, and economic dimensions of sustainability is difficult. This is because there is often disagreement about the relative importance of each. To resolve this, there is a need to integrate, balance, and reconcile the dimensions. For example, humans can choose to make ecological integrity a priority or to compromise it.

Some even argue the Sustainable Development Goals are unrealistic. Their aim of universal human well-being conflicts with the physical limits of Earth and its ecosystems.

Measurement tools

Environmental impacts of humans 

Methods to measure or describe human impacts on the Earth include the ecological footprint, ecological debt, carrying capacity, and sustainable yield. The concept of planetary boundaries considers that there are absolute thresholds of the carrying capacity of the planet which must not be crossed in order to prevent irreversible harm to the Earth. Environmental issues that have been proposed to have planetary boundaries include: climate change, biodiversity loss (changed in 2015 to change in biosphere integrity), biogeochemical (nitrogen and phosphorus), ocean acidification, land use, freshwater, ozone depletion, atmospheric aerosols, and chemical pollution (changed in 2015 to introduction of novel entities).

The IPAT formula, which was developed in the 1970s, states that the environmental impact of humans is proportional to human population, affluence and technology. Therefore, ways to increase environmental sustainability would include human population control, reducing consumption and affluence (e.g. reducing energy consumption), and developing innovative or green technologies (e.g. renewable energy). In other words, the broad aim would be to have fewer consumers and less environmental footprint per consumer or person.

The Millennium Ecosystem Assessment from 2005 measured 24 ecosystem services and concluded that only four have shown improvement over the last 50 years, while 15 are in serious decline and five are in a precarious condition.

Economic costs 

The field of environmental economics has proposed different methods for calculating the cost (or price) associated with the use of public natural resources. The damage to ecosystems and the loss of biodiversity were calculated in The Economics of Ecosystems and Biodiversity project from 2007 to 2011.

An entity that creates environmental and social costs often does not pay for them. The market price also does not reflect those costs. In the end, government policy is usually required to resolve this problem.

The social discount rate is the rate by which future costs and benefits should be discounted when making decisions. The more one is concerned about future generations, the lower the social discount rate should be. Another approach is to put an economic value on ecosystem services so that environmental damage can be assessed against perceived short-term welfare benefits. For example, it has been calculated that, "for every dollar spent on ecosystem restoration, between three and 75 dollars of economic benefits from ecosystem goods and services can be expected".

In recent years, the concept of doughnut economics has been developed by economist Kate Raworth to integrate social and environmental sustainability into economic thinking. The social dimension is here portrayed as a minimum standard to which a society should aspire, whereas an outer limit is imposed by the carrying capacity of the planet.

Barriers 
There are many reasons why sustainability is so difficult to achieve. These reasons are known as sustainability barriers. These barriers need to be analyzed and understood before they can be addressed effectively. Some barriers have their origins in nature and its complexity ("everything is related"). Others are rooted in the human condition: the value-action gap, for instance, relates to the fact that we often do not act according to our convictions. These barriers have been called intrinsic to the concept of sustainability as such.

Other barriers are extrinsic to the concept of sustainability. This means they could in principle be overcome, for example by putting a price tag on the consumption of public goods. A number of extrinsic barriers are related to the dominant institutional frameworks where market mechanisms often fail for public goods. Existing societies, economies, and cultures incite consumption expansion, so the structural imperative for growth in competitive market economies inhibits necessary societal change.

Furthermore, there are several barriers related to the difficulties of implementing sustainability policies. There are trade-offs to be made between objectives of environmental policies (such as nature conservation) and economic development (such as poverty reduction). There are also trade-offs between short-term profit and long-term viability. Political pressures generally favor the short term over the long term and thus constitute a barrier to actions oriented toward improving sustainability.

Barriers working against sustainability can also be due to the zeitgeist, such as consumerism and short-termism.

Transitions

Components and characteristics 
A sustainability transition is defined by the European Environment Agency as "a fundamental and wide-ranging transformation of a socio-technical system towards a more sustainable configuration that helps alleviate persistent problems such as climate change, pollution, biodiversity loss or resource scarcities." The concept of sustainability transitions is a similar to the concept of energy transitions.

It has been stated that a sustainability transition must be "supported by a new kind of culture, a new kind of collaboration, [and] a new kind of leadership". It requires substantial investment in "new and greener capital goods, while simultaneously shifting capital away from unsustainable systems" and actively demoting unsustainable options.

To achieve a sustainability transition, societies would have to change their fundamental values and organizing principles. These new values would emphasize "the quality of life and material sufficiency, human solidarity and global equity, and affinity with nature and environmental sustainability". Some scientists have said that a transition towards sustainability can only be effective if far-reaching lifestyle changes complement technological advancements.

Scientists have pointed out that: "Sustainability transitions come about in diverse ways, and all require civil-society pressure and evidence-based advocacy, political leadership, and a solid understanding of policy instruments, markets, and other drivers."

Four overlapping processes of transformation, each with different political dynamics, have been proposed: they are either led by technology, markets, government, or citizens.

Action principles 
Action principles that people and decision-makers can follow to facilitate more sustainable societies have been divided into four types:

 Nature-related principles: Decarbonize; reduce human environmental impact by efficiency, sufficiency and consistency; be net-positive – build up environmental and societal capital; prefer local, seasonal, plant-based and labor-intensive; polluter-pays principle; precautionary principle; and appreciate and celebrate the beauty of nature
 Personal principles: practice contemplation, apply policies cautiously, celebrate frugality
 Society-related principles: Grant the least privileged the greatest support; seek mutual understanding, trust and multiple wins; strengthen social cohesion and collaboration; engage the stakeholders; foster education – share knowledge and collaborate.
 Systems-related principles: Apply systems thinking, foster diversity, increase the transparency of the publicly relevant, maintain or increase option diversity.

Example steps 
The update to the 1992 World Scientists' Warning to Humanity proposed some steps humanity can take in three areas to transition to environmental sustainability: 

 Reduced consumption: reducing food waste, promoting dietary shifts towards mostly plant-based foods. 
 Reducing the number of consumers: further reducing fertility rates and thus population growth.
 Technology and nature conservation: maintaining nature's ecosystem services, promoting new green technologies, and adopting renewable energy sources while ending subsidies to energy production through fossil fuels.

Agenda 2030 for the Sustainable Development Goals 

In 2015, the United Nations General Assembly announced in the Agenda 2030 for the Sustainable Development Goals: "We are determined to take the bold and transformative steps which are urgently needed to shift the world on to a sustainable and resilient path." The 17 goals and targets lay out some of the transformative steps. For example, with regard to the future of the planet Earth, the UN's pledge is to "protect the planet from degradation, including through sustainable consumption and production, sustainably managing its natural resources and taking urgent action on climate change, so that it can support the needs of the present and future generations". The declaration stated that "In these Goals and targets, we are setting out a supremely ambitious and transformational vision" and described the SDGs as being "of unprecedented scope and significance".

Options for overcoming barriers

Issues around economic growth 

In order to resolve tradeoffs between economic growth and environmental conservation, the concept of eco-economic decoupling has been proposed. The idea would be to "decouple environmental bads from economic goods as a path towards sustainability". This would mean "using less resources per unit of economic output and reducing the environmental impact of any resources that are used or economic activities that are undertaken". Pressure on the environment can be measured by the intensity of pollutants emitted. Decoupling can then be measured by following changes in the emission intensity associated with economic output. Examples of absolute long-term decoupling are rare, but some industrialized countries have decoupled GDP growth from both production and, to a lesser extent, consumption-based  emissions. However, even in this example, decoupling alone is not sufficient and needs to be complemented by "sufficiency-oriented strategies and strict enforcement of absolute reduction targets".

A 2020 meta-analysis of 180 scientific studies found that there is "no evidence of the kind of decoupling needed for ecological sustainability" and that "in the absence of robust evidence, the goal of decoupling rests partly on faith". The possibilities for decoupling and thus the feasibility of green growth have been questioned. It has been argued that decoupling on its own will not sufficiently reduce environmental pressures, but needs to include the issue of economic growth. Adequate decoupling is currently not taking place due to rising energy expenditure, rebound effects, problem shifting, the underestimated impact of services, the limited potential of recycling, insufficient and inappropriate technological change, and cost-shifting. 

The decoupling of economic growth from environmental deterioration is difficult because environmental and social costs are not generally paid by the entity that causes them, and are therefore not expressed in the market price. For example, the cost of packaging may be factored into the price of a product, but the cost of disposing of that packaging may not. In economics, such factors are considered externalities, in this case a negative externality. Usually, externalities are either not covered at all or left to be addressed by government action or by local governance. 

Some examples of potential incorporation of environmental and social costs and benefits into economic activities include: taxing the activity (the polluter pays); subsidizing activities with positive effects (rewarding stewardship); and outlawing particular levels of damaging practices (legal limits on pollution).

Government action and local governance 

A textbook on natural resources and environmental economics stated in 2011: "Nobody who has seriously studied the issues believes that the economy's relationship to the natural environment can be left entirely to market forces." In other words: Without government action, natural resources are often over-exploited and destroyed in the long term.

Related to this aspect, Elinor Ostrom (winner of the 2009 Nobel Memorial Prize in Economic Sciences) stated that the choice should not be limited to either the market or the national government, and that local governance (or self-governance) can be a third option. She studied how people in small, local communities manage shared natural resources. She showed that, over time, communities using natural resources such as pastures, fishing waters, and forests can establish rules for use and maintenance that lead to both economic and ecological sustainability. An important requirement for the success of self-governance is to have groups in which participants are frequently communicating. In this case, groups can manage the usage of common goods without overexploitation. Based on Ostrom's work, it has been argued that: "Common-pool resources today are overcultivated because the different agents do not know each other and cannot directly communicate with one another."

Global governance 

Questions of global concern are difficult to tackle because global issues would require global solutions, but existing global organizations (UN, WTO, and others) are not sufficiently equipped. For example, they lack sanctioning mechanisms to enforce existing global regulations. Furthermore, they are not always accepted by all nations (an example is the International Criminal Court), their agendas are not aligned (for example UNEP, UNDP, and WTO), or they are accused of nepotism and mismanagement. There are also challenges that multilateral international agreements, treaties, and intergovernmental organizations (IGOs) face and which result in barriers to sustainability. There is a dependence on voluntary commitments (for example Nationally Determined Contributions for climate action), existing national or international regulation not being effectively enforced, and regulatory white spaces and control deficits for international actors (including multi-national enterprises). Lastly, many global organizations (such as WTO, IMF, World Bank, UNFCCC, G7, G8, OECD) are perceived to lack legitimacy and democracy.

Responses by nongovernmental stakeholders

Businesses 

Sustainable business practices integrate ecological concerns with social and economic ones. One accounting framework for this approach, the triple bottom line, uses the phrase "people, planet, and profit". The circular economy is a related concept with the ultimate goal of decoupling environmental pressure from economic growth.

Growing attention towards sustainability has led to the formation of many organizations such as the Sustainability Consortium of the Society for Organizational Learning, the Sustainable Business Institute, and the World Business Council for Sustainable Development. Supply chain sustainability refers to companies' efforts to consider the environmental and human impacts of their products' journey through the supply chain, from raw materials sourcing to production, storage, and delivery, and every transportation link in between.

Religious communities 

Religious leaders have stressed the importance of caring for nature and environmental sustainability. In 2015 over 150 leaders from various faiths issued a joint statement to the UN Climate Summit in Paris 2015. They reiterated a statement made in the Interfaith Summit in New York in 2014:As representatives from different faith and religious traditions, we stand together to express deep concern for the consequences of climate change on the earth and its people, all entrusted, as our faiths reveal, to our common care. Climate change is indeed a threat to life, a precious gift we have received and that we need to care for.

Individuals 

Individuals can change their lifestyles, practice ethical consumerism, and embrace frugality to live more sustainably. Sustainable living approaches can reduce environmental impacts by altering the built environment to make cities more sustainable. Such approaches include sustainable transport, sustainable architecture, and zero emission housing. Research can identify the main issues to focus on (e.g. flying, meat and dairy products, car driving, and household sufficiency) and how cultures of sufficiency, care, solidarity, and simplicity can be created.

Some young people are using activism, litigation, and on-the-ground efforts to advance sustainability, particularly in the area of climate action.

Critiques

Impossible to reach 
The concepts of sustainability and sustainable development have been criticized from different angles. According to Dennis Meadows, one of the authors of the first report to the Club of Rome, called "The Limits to Growth", many people deceive themselves by using the Brundtland definition of sustainability. This is because the needs of the present generation are actually not met today, and the economic activities to meet present needs will substantially diminish the options of future generations. Another criticism is that the paradigm of sustainability is no longer suitable as a guide for transformation because our societies are "socially and ecologically self-destructive consumer societies".

Some scholars have even proclaimed the end of the concept of sustainability because humans now have a significant impact on Earth's climate system and ecosystems. It might become impossible to pursue a goal of sustainability when faced with these complex, radical, and dynamic issues. Others have called sustainability a utopian ideal: "We need to keep sustainability as an ideal; an ideal which we might never reach, which might be utopian, but still a necessary one."

Vagueness 
The term is often hijacked and thus can lose its meaning. People use it for all sorts of things, such as saving the planet to recycling your rubbish. As sustainability is a concept that provides a normative structure (describing what human society regards as good or desirable), a specific definition may never be possible.

However, it has been argued that while sustainability is vague and contested it is not meaningless. Although lacking in a singular definition, this concept is still useful. Scholars have argued that its fuzziness can actually be liberating, since it means that "the basic goal of sustainability (maintaining or improving desirable conditions [...]) can be pursued with more flexibility".

Confusion and greenwashing 
Sustainability has a reputation as a buzzword. Confusion and mistrust can result when the terms sustainability and sustainable development are used in ways that are contradictory to more widely accepted conceptualizations. Therefore, a clear explanation of how the terms are being used in a particular situation is important.

Greenwashing is the practice of deceptive marketing by a company or organization by providing misleading information about the sustainability of a product, policy, or other activity. Investors are wary of this issue as it exposes them to risk. The reliability of eco-labels is also doubtful in some cases. Ecolabelling is a voluntary method of environmental performance certification and labelling that is attached to food and consumer products. The most credible eco-labels are those that are developed with close participation from all relevant stakeholders.

See also 
 List of sustainability topics
 Outline of sustainability

References

External links 

 United Nations 17 Sustainable Development Goals (SDGs)

 
Environmentalism
Economics of sustainability
Environmental social science concepts
Environmental terminology
Human-Environment interaction